Becca Fitzpatrick (born February 3, 1979) is an American author, best known for having written the New York Times bestseller Hush, Hush, a young adult novel published in 2009 by Simon & Schuster Books for Young Readers. She wrote three sequels to Hush, Hush (Crescendo, Silence, and Finale), along with two separate novels (Black Ice and Dangerous Lies). Fitzpatrick also contributed to the short story collection Kiss Me Deadly: 13 Tales of Paranormal Love.

Writing career 
On her 24th birthday in February 2003, Fitzpatrick was enrolled in an online writing class as a gift from her husband, which reignited her love for writing. However, success did not come instantaneously for Fitzpatrick. In fact, it took her four years and several rejection letters to publish her first book Hush, Hush in 2009.

Reviews for Hush, Hush were overwhelmingly positive, especially from fans of Stephenie Meyer’s novel Twilight, due to the novel’s forbidden romance between main characters Nora and Patch and the scenes of tension and sexuality between the pair. While readers were excited for the sequels, the one consistent flaw with the original was its unrealistic characters their lack of depth. Still, Hush, Hush was overall positively received, ranking number ten on The New York Times Best Seller list in November 2011.

Positive reviews for the first sequel to Hush, Hush, Crescendo are harder to find, as readers had similar criticisms to the first novel which Fitzpatrick did not address. For example, the "two-dimensionality" of her characters and the "self-centered heroine" trope of Nora were still issues. One particularly negative review noted that "the plot was illogical," and "awkward phrasing, clinched narrative, and persistent use of passive voice" created an extremely "unsatisfying ending." While the sequel to Crescendo was anticipated after ending on a cliff hanger, most reviewers were skeptical of it.

Unfortunately, reviews for Silence and Finale continued in the footsteps of Crescendo. Reviews for the pair are few and far between, but most describe the plot as "implausible [with] too many twists and turns and betrayals". Another prime example, involving Nora, is that she was "more concerned with skipping school and staying with her boyfriend, than leading an inevitable war." The Hush, Hush series was marketed towards lovers of paranormal fiction and romance, and it seems as if by the end of Finale those were the only fans of the series left.

Background 
Born in Ogden, Utah in 1979, Fitzpatrick developed a love of reading from a young age, being especially fond of Nancy Drew novels. She knew that she wanted to be a writer as young as age eight and took inspiration from various '80s television shows and movies. Fitzpatrick grew up as a member of the Church of Jesus Christ of Latter-day Saints and says that while her writing style was not directly influenced by her religion, there are hints of it across her novel in themes like "redemption."  

After moving from Utah to Idaho to attend high school, Fitzpatrick graduated in 1997 as valedictorian of her class. She was a student involved in various activities, including playing clarinet and running cross country, but did not consider herself a writer, saying she was "never making it past fifteen pages" while attempting to write short stories.

After graduating from high school, Fitzpatrick went on to marry her husband Justin in 2000 and graduate from Brigham Young University in 2001 with a degree in Community Health. She went on to work at an alternative high school in Provo, Utah, where she was employed in a variety of roles, including a teacher and a secretary, but she became overwhelmed with all that was expected of her.

Hush, Hush Series 

 Hush, Hush published by Simon & Schuster Books for Young Readers in 2009. New York Times bestselling novel in 2011.
 Crescendo published by Simon & Schuster Books for Young Readers in 2010.
 Silence published by Simon & Schuster Books for Young Readers in 2011.
 Finale published by Simon & Schuster Books for Young Readers in 2012.

Other Books

 Black Ice
 Dangerous Lies
 Kiss Me Deadly: 13 Tales of Paranormal Love: A compilation of 13 short stories written by different authors: Fitzpatrick, Caitlin Kittredge, Karen Mahoney, Justine Musk, Daniel Marks, Diana Peterfreund, Sarah Rees Brennan, Michelle Rowen, Carrie Ryan, Maggie Stiefvater, Rachel Vincent, Daniel Waters and Michelle Zink.
 All Good Things Come to an End: An e-sampler featuring excerpts from the first books in each series written by different authors: Fitzpatrick, Kate Brian, Jessica Verday, Rick Yancey and Scott Westerfeld.

External links
 Becca Fitzpatrick at the Internet Speculative Fiction Database

References 

1979 births
21st-century American novelists
American fantasy writers
Latter Day Saints from Nebraska
American women novelists
American young adult novelists
Brigham Young University alumni
Living people
People from North Platte, Nebraska
Writers from Provo, Utah
Place of birth missing (living people)
Writers from Nebraska
Women science fiction and fantasy writers
21st-century American women writers
Women writers of young adult literature
Novelists from Utah
Latter Day Saints from Utah